Jacques Nicolas Ernest Germain de Saint-Pierre (1 December 1814, Saint-Pierre-le-Moûtier – 28 June 1882, Hyères) was a French botanist. The plant genera Diserneston of the family Apiaceae and Ernestella and Saintpierrea of the family Rosaceae were named in his honor.

He was one of fifteen founding members of Société botanique de France (SBF), an institution that was established on 24 May 1854.

Publications 
 Atlas de la Flore des Environs de Paris (Atlas of the flora in environs around Paris), with Ernest Cosson (1819-1889), 1845
 Guide du botaniste ou Conseil pratique sur l'étude de la botanique  (Botanist's guide or practical counsel on the study of botany), edited by Victor Masson, 1852
 Nouveau Dictionnaire de botanique comprenant la description des familles naturelles, les propriétés médicales et les usages économiques des plants, la morphologie et la biologie des végétaux (New dictionary of botany including the description of natural families, medical properties and economic uses of plants, morphology and biology of plants), 1870.

References 
 "This article incorporates information based on a translation of an equivalent article at the French Wikipedia".

External links 
 IPNI List of plants described and co-described by Germain de Saint-Pierre.

19th-century French botanists
1814 births
1882 deaths
People from Nièvre